Thomas James Hudson, O.C., M.D., (born June 12, 1961) is a Canadian genome scientist noted for his leading role in the generation of physical maps of the human and mouse genomes and also his role in the International HapMap Project whose goal is to develop a haplotype map of the human genome.

As director of the McGill University and Genome Quebec Innovation Centre, which he established, Hudson and his team have made a number of discoveries in human genetics. These include genes mutated in rare diseases and genes involved in complex diseases such as asthma, type II diabetes and inflammatory bowel disease.

In July 2006, he was appointed president and scientific director of the Ontario Institute for Cancer Research. He is also editor-in-chief of the journal Human Genetics.

Thomas Hudson is married and has five children.

Beginnings and early career

Hudson was born in 1961 in Arvida, Quebec, where his father was a chemist for Alcan. He has six sisters including a twin sister.
He earned his M.D. degree in 1985 from the Université de Montréal. Then, he did residencies in internal medicine and Clinical Immunology and Allergy, the latter at McGill University Health Centre. In 1990, after a year of postdoctoral experience under the supervision of Emil Skamene and Danuta Radzioch, he went to the Massachusetts Institute of Technology for a fellowship with David Housman.

There he became involved with Eric Lander's projects and eventually led the effort to build a physical map of the human genome, which was an important step towards the generation of the complete sequence of the human genome. He supervised a large team of engineers, biologists, computer scientists to build high throughput PCR systems. The robot built by his team, called the "Genomatron", performed up to 300,000 PCR reactions per day. He was also part of an international effort to build a transcript map of the human genome. By 1996, his team had mapped more than 10,000 genes. In 1995, he became the assistant director of the Whitehead Institute/MIT Center for Genome Research a position which he held until 2001.

Montreal Genome Centre

In 1996, Hudson was recruited back to Montreal at the McGill University Health Centre where he created the Montreal Genome Centre. In 2003, Hudson expanded his team and moved into a new building on the McGill University campus called the McGill University and Genome Quebec Innovation Centre. The Centre possesses five different technology platforms (genotyping, sequencing, expression profiling, mass spectrometry and Information Technology) and also provides services to the Canadian and International community. By 2006, more than four hundred academic laboratories as well as a dozen of biotechnology companies have used the services of this new facility.

Until 2006, Hudson was also an associate professor in the departments of Human Genetics and Medicine at McGill University and associate physician at the McGill University Health Centre (Division of Immunology and Allergy). The main focus of his research is on the genetic dissection of complex diseases. His most important discoveries include the identification of genes involved in the development of Type II diabetes, susceptibility to leprosy, multiple sclerosis, asthma and inflammatory bowel disease. His team findings also include rare disease mutations such as the genes for spastic ataxia of Charlevoix-Saguenay (ARSACS) and Leigh syndrome French-Canadian Type (also known as lactic acidosis), that affect many families from the Saguenay region, of which he is a native.

One of his publications on inflammatory bowel disease in 2001 was the catalyst that led to the launch of the International HapMap project. More than 200 researchers from six different countries, including Hudson and his team,  worked on the project. The HapMap, which was completed in October 2005, is a catalog of genetic variations - called single nucleotide polymorphisms (SNPs) - and will help in discovering how these variations correlate with risk of developing complex diseases.

Leadership in Canada

Hudson has been a key player in many national organizations. He was Associate Director of the Canadian Genetics Disease Network from 2001 to 2005, and he has helped launch Genome Canada and Genome Quebec, of which he was the first scientific director in 2002. In addition, he has been a member of the Scientific Advisory Board for many public organizations or private companies.

New horizons

In July 2006, Hudson announced that he was leaving Montreal to lead the newly created Ontario Institute for Cancer Research in Toronto, Ontario which will focus on the genomics of cancer. Hudson remained acting scientific director of the McGill University and Genome Quebec Innovation Centre, until his successor Mark Lathrop succeeded him in 2011. Currently, Hudson is serving as Senior Vice President, R&D, and Chief Scientific Officer at AbbVie.

Awards

Hudson's accomplishments have been recognized by numerous awards and honors:

 In 1998, he was a recipient of Canada's Top 40 Under 40
 In 2000, he received the Scientist of the Year award by Radio-Canada
 In 2001, he received the Robert H. Haynes Young Scientist Award by the Genetics Society of Canada
 In 2002, he received a Burroughs-Wellcome Clinician-Scientist Award 
 In 2005, was voted as the person who made the most significant contribution to healthcare by the readers of Maclean's
 In 2006, he was elected to the Royal Society of Canada
 In 2013, he was appointed as an Officer of the Order of Canada

References

External links
McGill University and Genome Quebec Innovation Centre
Ontario Institute for Cancer Research

1961 births
Living people
Canadian geneticists
Fellows of the Royal Society of Canada
Academic staff of McGill University
Officers of the Order of Canada
People from Saguenay, Quebec
Université de Montréal alumni